Thylacares is a genus of Thylacocephalan containing only the single species Thylacares brandonensis. Found in Silurian period strata from the Brandon Bridge Formation in Waukesha, Wisconsin, U.S., the species is distinguishable from other Thylacocephalans by its smaller raptorial appendages and compound eyes. The body is fully encased in a bivalve shell, with only the eyes protruding on stalks. The species' trunk is composed of about 22 segments.

References

Prehistoric crustaceans
Silurian arthropods
Silurian arthropods of North America
Fossil taxa described in 2014
Paleontology in Wisconsin